Harold Earl Edmund Lovell (born September 27, 1955) is a politician from Antigua and Barbuda. He was the Minister of Finance, the Economy and Public Administration. He was also the minister of tourism and civil aviation. He was the Foreign Minister of Antigua and Barbuda from August 2004 to January 2005, when Prime Minister Baldwin Spencer took over those posts in a cabinet reshuffle, giving Lovell his current posts.

Early life and education
Harold Lovell Jr. was born on September 27, 1955, in St. John's city. He attended the Antigua Grammar School and obtained his tertiary education at the University of the West Indies where he obtained his bachelor's degree in Geography and Geology.

In 1984, he went on to study at the Thames Valley University and Middle Temple, qualifying him as a Barrister-at-Law. 
 
He also holds a Masters of Jurisprudence Degree from the University of Birmingham.

Career
Harold's professional life started at the Antigua Public Utilities Authority. He entered the teaching profession in 1978 with assignments at the Antigua Grammar School and The Antigua State College. At the height of the momentous teacher's struggle in 1979, after being arrested and beaten, Harold was fired by the Bird regime for his pursuit of justice.

Harold Lovell was Vice President of the Guild of Undergraduates at the University of the West Indies, General Secretary and then Vice Chairman of the Antigua Caribbean Liberation Movement, General Secretary of the Antigua and Barbuda Union of Teachers and Vice Chairman of the United Progressive Party (UPP). While in England he served on the British Broadcasting Corporation (BBC) Advisory Council for Leicestershire, England, between 1990 and 1992. After being successful in the 2009 general elections Lovell became the new Minister of Finance and the Economy.

See also
List of foreign ministers in 2004
List of foreign ministers in 2005

References

External links

 

Living people
1955 births
Antigua and Barbuda politicians
Alumni of the University of West London
Antigua Caribbean Liberation Movement politicians
United Progressive Party (Antigua and Barbuda) politicians
Antigua and Barbuda lawyers
Finance ministers of Antigua and Barbuda
Foreign ministers of Antigua and Barbuda
Government ministers of Antigua and Barbuda
Alumni of the University of Birmingham
People from St. John's, Antigua and Barbuda